Dyakiidae is a family of air-breathing land snails terrestrial pulmonate gastropod mollusks in the superfamily Trochomorphoidea (according to the taxonomy of the Gastropoda by Bouchet & Rocroi, 2005).

Some of the species in this family are sinistral (left-handed) in their shell coiling.

Distribution 
The family Dyakiidae is endemic to Sundaland in Southeast Asia.

Anatomy
In this family, the number of haploid chromosomes is between 26 and 30 (according to the values in this table).

The family also includes Quantula striata, the only known terrestrial gastropod to emit light.

The Digestive system characteristics are as follows. The buccal mass is small. The jaw is smooth. The stomach is very simple with weak muscles (as is the case in the majority of land snails). (These anatomical characteristics also include the family Staffordiidae which was considered part of the Dyakiidae at the time the study was done).

Genera 
The family Dyakiidae includes the following 11 genera, with a steadily increasing number of described species (71 species until 2007 + 11 new species in 2009):

 Asperitas Gray, 1857 - 14 species
 Bertia Ancey, 1887 - at least 4 species
 Dyakia Godwin-Austen, 1891 - type genus, 22 species
 Elaphroconcha Gude, 1911 - 10 species
 Everettia Godwin-Austen, 1891 - 25 species
 Kalamantania Laidlaw, 1931 - only one species: Kalamantania whiteheadi (Godwin-Austen, 1891)
 Phuphania Tumpeesuwan, Naggs & Panha, 2007 - 3 species including: Phuphania globosa Tumpeesuwan, Naggs & Panha, 2007
 Pseudoplecta Laidlaw, 1932 - only one species: Pseudoplecta bijuga (Stoliczka, 1873)
 Pseudoquantula Jirapatrasilp & Panha gen. nov. - only one species: Pseudoquantula lenticularis Jirapatrasilp & Panha sp. nov.
 Quantula Baker, 1941 - 7 species including: Quantula striata (Gray, 1834)
 Rhinocochlis Thiele, 1931 - only one species: Rhinocochlis nasuta (Metcalfe, 1852)
 Sasakina Rensch, 1930 - 5 species

Cladogram 
The following cladogram shows the phylogenic relationships of this family and superfamily with the other families within the limacoid clade:

References

Further reading 
 Laidlaw F. F. (1931). "On a new sub-family Dyakiinae of the Zonitidae". Proceedings of the malacological Society of London 19: 190-201. abstract.
 Schileyko A. A. (2003). "Treatise on recent terrestrial pulmonate mollusks. 10. Ariophantidae, Ostracolethaidae, Ryssotidae, Milacidae, Dyakiidae, Staffordiidae, Gastrodontidae, Zonitidae, Daudebardiidae, Parmacellidae". Ruthenica, Supplement 2. 1309-1466.
 Bouchet P., Rocroi J.P., Hausdorf B., Kaim A., Kano Y., Nützel A., Parkhaev P., Schrödl M. & Strong E.E. (2017). Revised classification, nomenclator and typification of gastropod and monoplacophoran families. Malacologia. 61(1-2): 1-526

External links 
 Gude, G. K. & Woodward, B. B. (1921). On Helicella, Férussac. Proceedings of the Malacological Society of London. 14 (5/6): 174-190. Londo